In abstract algebra, the symmetric group defined over any set is the group whose elements are all the bijections from the set to itself, and whose group operation is the composition of functions. In particular, the finite symmetric group  defined over a finite set of  symbols consists of the permutations that can be performed on the  symbols.

Although symmetric groups can be defined on infinite sets, this article focuses on the finite symmetric groups: their applications, their elements, their conjugacy classes, a finite presentation, their subgroups, their automorphism groups, and their representation theory. For the remainder of this article, "symmetric group" will mean a symmetric group on a finite set.

The symmetric group is important to diverse areas of mathematics such as Galois theory, invariant theory, the representation theory of Lie groups, and combinatorics. Cayley's theorem states that every group  is isomorphic to a subgroup of the symmetric group on (the underlying set of) .

Definition and first properties 
For finite sets, "permutations" and "bijective functions" refer to the same operation, namely rearrangement. The symmetric group of degree  is the symmetric group on the set .

The symmetric group on a set of  elements has order  (the factorial of ). It is abelian if and only if  is less than or equal to 2. The group Sn is solvable if and only if . This is an essential part of the proof of the Abel–Ruffini theorem that shows that for every  there are polynomials of degree  which are not solvable by radicals, that is, the solutions cannot be expressed by performing a finite number of operations of addition, subtraction, multiplication, division and root extraction on the polynomial's coefficients.

Applications 
The symmetric group on a set of size n is the Galois group of the general polynomial of degree n and plays an important role in Galois theory.  In invariant theory, the symmetric group acts on the variables of a multi-variate function, and the functions left invariant are the so-called symmetric functions.  In the representation theory of Lie groups, the representation theory of the symmetric group plays a fundamental role through the ideas of Schur functors.  

In the theory of Coxeter groups, the symmetric group is the Coxeter group of type An and occurs as the Weyl group of the general linear group.  In combinatorics, the symmetric groups, their elements (permutations), and their representations provide a rich source of problems involving Young tableaux, plactic monoids, and the Bruhat order.  Subgroups of symmetric groups are called permutation groups and are widely studied because of their importance in understanding group actions, homogeneous spaces, and automorphism groups of graphs, such as the Higman–Sims group and the Higman–Sims graph.

Group properties and special elements 
The elements of the symmetric group on a set X are the permutations of X.

Multiplication 
The group operation in a symmetric group is function composition, denoted by the symbol ∘ or simply by just a composition of the permutations. The composition  of permutations f and g, pronounced "f of g", maps any element x of X to f(g(x)). Concretely, let (see permutation for an explanation of notation):

 
 

Applying f after g maps 1 first to 2 and then 2 to itself; 2 to 5 and then to 4; 3 to 4 and then to 5, and so on. So composing f and g gives
 

A cycle of length , taken to the kth power, will decompose into k cycles of length m: For example,,

Verification of group axioms 
To check that the symmetric group on a set X is indeed a group, it is necessary to verify the group axioms of closure, associativity, identity, and inverses.
 The operation of function composition is closed in the set of permutations of the given set X.
 Function composition is always associative.
 The trivial bijection that assigns each element of X to itself serves as an identity for the group.
 Every bijection has an inverse function that undoes its action, and thus each element of a symmetric group does have an inverse which is a permutation too.

Transpositions, sign, and the alternating group 

A transposition is a permutation which exchanges two elements and keeps all others fixed; for example (1 3) is a transposition. Every permutation can be written as a product of transpositions; for instance, the permutation g from above can be written as g = (1 2)(2 5)(3 4). Since g can be written as a product of an odd number of transpositions, it is then called an odd permutation, whereas f is an even permutation.

The representation of a permutation as a product of transpositions is not unique; however, the number of transpositions needed to represent a given permutation is either always even or always odd. There are several short proofs of the invariance of this parity of a permutation.

The product of two even permutations is even, the product of two odd permutations is even, and all other products are odd.  Thus we can define the sign of a permutation:

With this definition,

is a group homomorphism ({+1, −1} is a group under multiplication, where +1 is e, the neutral element). The kernel of this homomorphism, that is, the set of all even permutations, is called the alternating group An. It is a normal subgroup of Sn, and for  it has  elements. The group Sn is the semidirect product of An and any subgroup generated by a single transposition.

Furthermore, every permutation can be written as a product of adjacent transpositions, that is, transpositions of the form . The sorting algorithm bubble sort is an application of this fact. The representation of a permutation as a product of adjacent transpositions is also not unique.

Cycles 
A cycle of length k is a permutation f for which there exists an element x in {1, ..., n} such that x, f(x), f2(x), ..., fk(x) = x are the only elements moved by f; it is required that  since with  the element x itself would not be moved either. The permutation h defined by

The order of a cycle is equal to its length. Cycles of length two are transpositions. Two cycles are disjoint if they have disjoint subsets of elements. Disjoint cycles commute: for example, in S6 there is the equality . Every element of Sn can be written as a product of disjoint cycles; this representation is unique up to the order of the factors, and the freedom present in representing each individual cycle by choosing its starting point.

Cycles admit the following conjugation property with any permutation , this property is often used to obtain its generators and relations.

Special elements 
Certain elements of the symmetric group of {1, 2, ..., n} are of particular interest (these can be generalized to the symmetric group of any finite totally ordered set, but not to that of an unordered set).

The  is the one given by:

This is the unique maximal element with respect to the Bruhat order and the
longest element in the symmetric group with respect to generating set consisting of the adjacent transpositions , .

 

so it thus has sign:

which is 4-periodic in n.

In S2n, the perfect shuffle is the permutation that splits the set into 2 piles and interleaves them. Its sign is also 

Note that the reverse on n elements and perfect shuffle on 2n elements have the same sign; these are important to the classification of Clifford algebras, which are 8-periodic.

Conjugacy classes 

The conjugacy classes of Sn correspond to the cycle types of permutations; that is, two elements of Sn are conjugate in Sn if and only if they consist of the same number of disjoint cycles of the same lengths. For instance, in S5, (1 2 3)(4 5) and (1 4 3)(2 5) are conjugate; (1 2 3)(4 5) and (1 2)(4 5) are not. A conjugating element of Sn can be constructed in "two line notation" by placing the "cycle notations" of the two conjugate permutations on top of one another.  Continuing the previous example,

which can be written as the product of cycles as (2 4).
This permutation then relates (1 2 3)(4 5) and (1 4 3)(2 5) via conjugation, that is,

It is clear that such a permutation is not unique.

Low degree groups 

The low-degree symmetric groups have simpler and exceptional structure, and often must be treated separately.

In this case the alternating group agrees with the symmetric group, rather than being an index 2 subgroup, and the sign map is trivial. In the case of S0, its only member is the empty function.

S2 This group consists of exactly two elements: the identity and the permutation swapping the two points. It is a cyclic group and is thus abelian. In Galois theory, this corresponds to the fact that the quadratic formula gives a direct solution to the general quadratic polynomial after extracting only a single root. This process is known as symmetrization.

S3 S3 is the first nonabelian symmetric group.  This group is isomorphic to the dihedral group of order 6, the group of reflection and rotation symmetries of an equilateral triangle, since these symmetries permute the three vertices of the triangle. Cycles of length two correspond to reflections, and cycles of length three are rotations.  In Galois theory, the sign map from S3 to S2 corresponds to the resolving quadratic for a cubic polynomial, as discovered by Gerolamo Cardano, while the A3 kernel corresponds to the use of the discrete Fourier transform of order 3 in the solution, in the form of Lagrange resolvents.

S4 The group S4 is isomorphic to the group of proper rotations about opposite faces, opposite diagonals and opposite edges, 9, 8 and 6 permutations, of the cube. Beyond the group A4, S4 has a Klein four-group V as a proper normal subgroup, namely the even transpositions  with quotient S3. In Galois theory, this map corresponds to the resolving cubic to a quartic polynomial, which allows the quartic to be solved by radicals, as established by Lodovico Ferrari. The Klein group can be understood in terms of the Lagrange resolvents of the quartic.

S5 S5 is the first non-solvable symmetric group.  Along with the special linear group  and the icosahedral group , S5 is one of the three non-solvable groups of order 120, up to isomorphism.  S5 is the Galois group of the general quintic equation, and the fact that S5 is not a solvable group translates into the non-existence of a general formula to solve quintic polynomials by radicals.  There is an exotic inclusion map  as a transitive subgroup; the obvious inclusion map  fixes a point and thus is not transitive. This yields the outer automorphism of S6, discussed below, and corresponds to the resolvent sextic of a quintic.

S6 Unlike all other symmetric groups, S6, has an outer automorphism.  Using the language of Galois theory, this can also be understood in terms of Lagrange resolvents. The resolvent of a quintic is of degree 6—this corresponds to an exotic inclusion map  as a transitive subgroup (the obvious inclusion map  fixes a point and thus is not transitive) and, while this map does not make the general quintic solvable, it yields the exotic outer automorphism of S6—see Automorphisms of the symmetric and alternating groups for details.

Note that while A6 and A7 have an exceptional Schur multiplier (a triple cover) and that these extend to triple covers of S6 and S7, these do not correspond to exceptional Schur multipliers of the symmetric group.

Maps between symmetric groups 

Other than the trivial map  and the sign map , the most notable homomorphisms between symmetric groups, in order of relative dimension, are:
  corresponding to the exceptional normal subgroup ;
  (or rather, a class of such maps up to inner automorphism) corresponding to the outer automorphism of S6.
  as a transitive subgroup, yielding the outer automorphism of S6 as discussed above.
There are also a host of other homomorphisms  where .

Relation with alternating group 
For , the alternating group An is simple, and the induced quotient is the sign map:  which is split by taking a transposition of two elements. Thus Sn is the semidirect product , and has no other proper normal subgroups, as they would intersect An in either the identity (and thus themselves be the identity or a 2-element group, which is not normal), or in An (and thus themselves be An or Sn).

Conjugation by even elements are inner automorphisms of An while the outer automorphism of An of order 2 corresponds to conjugation by an odd element. For , there is an exceptional outer automorphism of An so Sn is not the full automorphism group of An.

For , Sn is an almost simple group, as it lies between the simple group An and its group of automorphisms.

Generators and relations 
The collection  generates  subject to the following relations:

where 1 represents the identity permutation.  This representation endows the symmetric group with the structure of a Coxeter group (and so also a reflection group).

Subgroup structure 
A subgroup of a symmetric group is called a permutation group.

Normal subgroups 
The normal subgroups of the finite symmetric groups are well understood. If , Sn has at most 2 elements, and so has no nontrivial proper subgroups.

The symmetric group on an infinite set does not have a subgroup of index 2, as Vitali (1915) proved that each permutation can be written as a product of three squares. However it contains the normal subgroup S of permutations that fix all but finitely many elements, which is generated by transpositions. Those elements of S that are products of an even number of transpositions form a subgroup of index 2 in S, called the alternating subgroup A. Since A is even a characteristic subgroup of S, it is also a normal subgroup of the full symmetric group of the infinite set. The groups A and S are the only nontrivial proper normal subgroups of the symmetric group on a countably infinite set. This was first proved by Onofri (1929) and independently Schreier–Ulam (1934).

Maximal subgroups 

The maximal subgroups of Sn fall into three classes: the intransitive, the imprimitive, and the primitive. The imprimitive maximal subgroups are exactly those of the form , where  is a proper divisor of n and "wr" denotes the wreath product.

Sylow subgroups 
The Sylow subgroups of the symmetric groups are important examples of p-groups.  They are more easily described in special cases first:

The Sylow p-subgroups of the symmetric group of degree p are just the cyclic subgroups generated by p-cycles.  There are  such subgroups simply by counting generators.  The normalizer therefore has order  and is known as a Frobenius group  (especially for ), and is the affine general linear group, .

The Sylow p-subgroups of the symmetric group of degree p2 are the wreath product of two cyclic groups of order p.

The Sylow p-subgroups of the symmetric group of degree pn are sometimes denoted Wp(n), and using this notation one has that  is the wreath product of Wp(n) and Wp(1).

Transitive subgroups 
A transitive subgroup of Sn is a subgroup whose action on {1, 2, ,..., n} is transitive. For example, the Galois group of a (finite) Galois extension is a transitive subgroup of Sn, for some n.

Cayley's theorem
Cayley's theorem states that every group G is isomorphic to a subgroup of some symmetric group.  In particular, one may take a subgroup of the symmetric group on the elements of G, since every group acts on itself faithfully by (left or right) multiplication.

Cyclic subgroups 

Cyclic groups are those that are generated by a single permutation. When a permutation is represented in cycle notation, the order of the cyclic subgroup that it generates is the least common multiple of the lengths of its cycles.  For example, in S, one cyclic subgroup of order 5 is generated by (13254), whereas the largest cyclic subgroups of S are generated by elements like (123)(45) that have one cycle of length 3 and another cycle of length 2. This rules out many groups as possible subgroups of symmetric groups of a given size. For example, S has no subgroup of order 15 (a divisor of the order of S), because the only group of order 15 is the cyclic group.  The largest possible order of a cyclic subgroup (equivalently, the largest possible order of an element in S) is given by Landau's function.

Automorphism group 

For , Sn is a complete group: its center and outer automorphism group are both trivial.

For , the automorphism group is trivial, but S2 is not trivial: it is isomorphic to C2, which is abelian, and hence the center is the whole group.

For , it has an outer automorphism of order 2: , and the automorphism group is a semidirect product .

Homology 

The group homology of Sn is quite regular and stabilizes: the first homology (concretely, the abelianization) is:

The first homology group is the abelianization, and corresponds to the sign map Sn → S2 which is the abelianization for n ≥ 2; for n < 2 the symmetric group is trivial. This homology is easily computed as follows: Sn is generated by involutions (2-cycles, which have order 2), so the only non-trivial maps  are to S2 and all involutions are conjugate, hence map to the same element in the abelianization (since conjugation is trivial in abelian groups). Thus the only possible maps  send an involution to 1 (the trivial map) or to −1 (the sign map). One must also show that the sign map is well-defined, but assuming that, this gives the first homology of Sn.

The second homology (concretely, the Schur multiplier) is:

The homology "stabilizes" in the sense of stable homotopy theory: there is an inclusion map , and for fixed k, the induced map on homology  is an isomorphism for sufficiently high n. This is analogous to the homology of families Lie groups stabilizing.

Representation theory 

The representation theory of the symmetric group is a particular case of the representation theory of finite groups, for which a concrete and detailed theory can be obtained. This has a large area of potential applications, from symmetric function theory to problems of quantum mechanics for a number of identical particles.

The symmetric group Sn has order n!. Its conjugacy classes are labeled by partitions of n. Therefore, according to the representation theory of a finite group, the number of inequivalent irreducible representations, over the complex numbers, is equal to the number of partitions of n. Unlike the general situation for finite groups, there is in fact a natural way to parametrize irreducible representation by the same set that parametrizes conjugacy classes, namely by partitions of n or equivalently Young diagrams of size n.

Each such irreducible representation can be realized over the integers (every permutation acting by a matrix with integer coefficients); it can be explicitly constructed by computing the Young symmetrizers acting on a space generated by the Young tableaux of shape given by the Young diagram.

Over other fields the situation can become much more complicated.  If the field K has characteristic equal to zero or greater than n then by Maschke's theorem the group algebra KSn is semisimple. In these cases the irreducible representations defined over the integers give the complete set of irreducible representations (after reduction modulo the characteristic if necessary).

However, the irreducible representations of the symmetric group are not known in arbitrary characteristic. In this context it is more usual to use the language of modules rather than representations. The representation obtained from an irreducible representation defined over the integers by reducing modulo the characteristic will not in general be irreducible. The modules so constructed are called Specht modules, and every irreducible does arise inside some such module. There are now fewer irreducibles, and although they can be classified they are very poorly understood. For example, even their dimensions are not known in general.

The determination of the irreducible modules for the symmetric group over an arbitrary field is widely regarded as one of the most important open problems in representation theory.

See also 
 Braid group
 History of group theory
 Signed symmetric group and Generalized symmetric group
 
 Symmetric inverse semigroup
 Symmetric power

Notes

References 

 
 
 .

External links
 
 
 
Marcus du Sautoy: Symmetry, reality's riddle (video of a talk)
 OEIS Entries dealing with the Symmetric Group

Permutation groups
Symmetry
Finite reflection groups